Jaggampeta Mandal is one of the 21 mandals in Kakinada District of Andhra Pradesh. As per census 2011, there are 19 villages.

Demographics

Towns & Villages

Villages 

Balabhadrapuram
Gollalagunta
Govindapuram
Gurrappalem
Irripaka
J. Kothuru
Jaggampeta
Kandregula
Katravulapalle
Mallisala
Mamidada
Manyanvaripalem
Marripaka
Narendrapatnam
Rajapudi
Ramavaram
Seethampeta
Seethanagaram
Tirupatirajupeta

See also 
List of mandals in Andhra Pradesh

References 

Mandals in Kakinada district
Mandals in Andhra Pradesh